Jukka Mika Petteri Hentunen (born May 3, 1974) is a Finnish former professional ice hockey forward, who last played with KalPa of the SM-liiga in the 2012–13 season.

Playing career
Hentunen played with HPK of the SM-liiga when he was drafted by the Calgary Flames as their sixth-round pick, 176th overall, in the 2000 NHL Entry Draft. He played a total of 38 National Hockey League games in the 2001–02 NHL season for the Calgary Flames and the Nashville Predators, who he was traded to on March 19, 2002.

Hentunen then promptly left North America to continue his professional career in the European leagues. After two years with HC Fribourg-Gottéron, the right winger signed with Swiss rivals,  HC Lugano.

In Finland he's earned a nickname "Härkä" which translates to "bull."

Career statistics

Regular season and playoffs

International

References

External links 

1974 births
Living people
Ak Bars Kazan players
Calgary Flames draft picks
Calgary Flames players
Finnish expatriate ice hockey players in Russia
Finnish ice hockey right wingers
HC Fribourg-Gottéron players
HPK players
Ice hockey players at the 2006 Winter Olympics
Jokerit players
KalPa players
Kokkolan Hermes players
HC Lugano players
Medalists at the 2006 Winter Olympics
Nashville Predators players
Olympic ice hockey players of Finland
Olympic medalists in ice hockey
Olympic silver medalists for Finland
People from Joroinen
Saint John Flames players
Sportspeople from South Savo